Faroese or Faroish may refer to anything pertaining to the Faroe Islands, e.g.:
the Faroese language
 the Faroese people

Language and nationality disambiguation pages